Tiitsa is a village in Rõuge Parish, Võru County, Estonia. Between 1991–2017 (until the administrative reform of Estonian municipalities) the village was located in Mõniste Parish.

References

External links 
Satellite map at Maplandia.com

Villages in Võru County